Tran Huu Dung (Vietnamese : Trần Hữu Dũng) (1946 — 2023) was a professor of economics at Wright State University in Dayton, Ohio. He was a specialist in the economies of East Asia, particularly Vietnam.

For more than twenty years, Dung (pronounced Zung) was also the managing editor of the popular web portal Arts & Letters Daily.

He received a Ph.D. in economics from Syracuse University in 1978.

See also
 List of Vietnamese Americans

External links
Professor Dung's Personal Webpage
Arts & Letters Daily

21st-century American economists
American people of Vietnamese descent
Wright State University faculty
Academics of Vietnamese descent
20th-century American economists